To beget means in English 'to sire (a child)', 'to cause or produce' through reproduction.

Beget may refer to:
 Bögöt, Kyrgyzstan, a village in Kyrgyzstan
 , a village in the Province of Girona, Spain

See also 
 Becket